Cremnosterna plagiata is a species of beetle in the family Cerambycidae. It was described by White in 1858. It is known from Myanmar, Malaysia, India, and Thailand.

Varietas
 Cremnosterna plagiata var. maculicornis (Thomson, 1865)
 Cremnosterna plagiata var. reducta Breuning, 1943

References

Lamiini
Beetles described in 1858